Dvadasha stotra is a series of 12 Stotras composed by Sri Madhvacharya, the 13th-century founder of the Tattvavada or Dvaita school of philosophy. 'Dvadasha' in Sanskrit means 12 and all the 12 stotras are in praise of Lord Vishnu. It is believed that the stotras were composed in connection with the installation of the idol of Lord Krishna at Udupi. While most of the 12 stotras are praises of the Lord, the third stotra is actually a summary of Madhvacharya's philosophy.

There have been numerous musical compositions of Dvadasha stotras over the years. It is also a ritual to recite the Dvadasha stotras at the time of "naivedya" or offering of food to God at Madhva temples.

Commentaries and translations
There are eight known commentaries on the Dvadasha stotras. They are by,

 Gangodamishra
 Gûdhakartrka
 Chalari Narasimhacharya
 Channapattana Thimmannacharya
 Umarji Tirumalacharya
 C M Padmanabhacharya
 Punyashravana Bhikshu
 Sri Vishwapati Tîrtha

See also 

 Prameya shloka
 Paryaya

References

External links 
Transliteration of the Dvadasha Stotras in Roman alphabets

Dvaita Vedanta
Hindu devotional texts
Madhvacharya
Vaishnavism
13th-century Indian books